Chhatara is a village in Bajura District in the Seti Zone of north-western Nepal, It lies in Ward No. 1 of Triveni Municipality.

References

Populated places in Bajura District